The 1900 United States presidential election in Texas took place on November 6, 1900. All contemporary 45 states were part of the 1900 United States presidential election. State voters chose 15 electors to the Electoral College, which selected the president and vice president.

Texas was won by the Democratic nominees, former U.S. Representative William Jennings Bryan of Nebraska and his running mate Adlai Stevenson I of Illinois.

Bryan had previously won the Lone Star State against William McKinley in 1896 and would later win the state again against William Howard Taft in 1908. As of the 2020 election this is the last time that a Republican won re-election to the presidency without carrying Texas once.

Results

See also
 United States presidential elections in Texas

Notes

References

Texas
1900
1900 Texas elections